The Chihuahuan spotted whiptail (Aspidoscelis exsanguis) is a species of lizard native to the United States in southern Arizona, southern New Mexico and southwestern Texas, and northern Mexico in northern Chihuahua and northern Sonora.

The species is believed to be the result of extensive hybridization between the little striped whiptail, Aspidoscelis inornatus, the plateau spotted whiptail, Aspidoscelis septemvittatus, and the western Mexico whiptail, Aspidoscelis costatus. It is one of many lizard species known to be parthenogenetic.

Description 
The Chihuahuan spotted whiptail grows from 9.5 to 12 inches in length. It is typically a reddish-brown in color, with six lighter colored stripes that run the length of the body, with spotting between the stripes. The underside is white or sometimes pale blue. It is slender-bodied with a tail nearly three times its body length.

Biology
Like most whiptailed lizards, the Chihuahua spotted whiptail is diurnal and insectivorous.

This species can be found in many kinds of mostly arid habitat, including desert, desert grassland, dry basin forests, and oak, pine, and juniper woodland, where it lives in washes and canyons. It digs holes to lay eggs.

Conservation
This is not considered to be a threatened species.

References

External links
NatureServe. 2015. Aspidoscelis exsanguis. NatureServe Explorer Version 7.1.

Aspidoscelis
Reptiles of the United States
Reptiles of Mexico
Fauna of the Southwestern United States
Fauna of the Sonoran Desert
Fauna of the Chihuahuan Desert
Reptiles described in 1956
Taxa named by Charles Herbert Lowe